Orville Melville "Tiny" Hewitt (September 5, 1901 – October 29, 1955) was a college football player and coach. He played for both the Pittsburgh Panthers and Army Cadets as a 200-pound fullback. Hewitt coached for the Alabama Crimson Tide.

Biography
Orville Hewitt was born on September 5, 1901.

He graduated from the United States Military Academy at West Point in 1927.

He died in Avery County, North Carolina, near Asheville, on October 29, 1955, and was buried at Arlington National Cemetery.

References

External links
Arlington National Cemetery

1901 births
1955 deaths
Pittsburgh Panthers football players
American football fullbacks
Sportspeople from Pittsburgh
Alabama Crimson Tide football coaches
Army Black Knights football players
Players of American football from Pittsburgh
Burials at Arlington National Cemetery
United States Army colonels